Avelina Montserrat Conejo Ruiz (born February 3, 1993) is a Mexican female mixed martial artist who competes in the Strawweight division of the Ultimate Fighting Championship.

Background
At the age of 16, Ruiz started practicing Olympic wrestling at the Técnica 1 in León, Guanajuato, later became a national selection, living for three years at the Centro Nacional de Alto Rendimiento (CNAR) in Mexico City and then made the leap to MMA. She was a 7-time national champion in Mexico.

Mixed martial arts career

Early career
Montserrat Ruiz made her professional MMA debut in 2014 at the Gladiators Coliseum, a promoter in Mexico. She achieved a winning streak of nine fights fighting under various MMA promotions in Mexico before entering the American circuit.

Invicta FC
Ruiz made her promotional debut for Invicta FC against UFC vet Danielle Taylor at Invicta FC 33 on December 15, 2018. She lost the fight via unanimous decision.

After the loss to Danielle, she suffered an injury that kept her out of the cage for more than a year.

In her sophomore performance, Ruiz faced Janaisa Morandin on July 30, 2020 at Invicta FC 41: Morandin vs. Ruiz. She won the bout with ease through first round scarf hold keylock submission.

Ruiz was scheduled to face Emily Ducote for the vacant Invicta FC Strawweight Championship at Invicta FC 43, however on the day of the event, the fight was cancelled due to COVID precautions.

Ultimate Fighting Championship
Ruiz made her UFC debut as a short notice replacement for Kay Hansen against Cheyanne Buys on March 20, 2021 at UFC on ESPN: Brunson vs. Holland. She won the bout via unanimous decision, keeping Buys in the headlock position for most of the bout.

Ruiz faced Amanda Lemos on July 17, 2021 at UFC on ESPN 26. Ruiz lost the fight via a technical knockout in round one.

Ruiz was scheduled to face Mallory Martin on December 4, 2021 at UFC on ESPN 31. However Ruiz was forced out of the event and she was replaced by Cheyanne Buys.

Championships and accomplishments

Mixed martial arts 
 Xtreme Fighters Latino
XFL Strawweight Championship 
 MAX Fights
MAX Fights Strawweight Championship

Mixed martial arts record

|-
|Loss
|align=center|10–2
|Amanda Lemos
|TKO (punches)
|UFC on ESPN: Makhachev vs. Moisés 
|
|align=center|1
|align=center|0:35
|Las Vegas, Nevada, United States
|
|-
|Win
|align=center|10–1
|Cheyanne Vlismas
|Decision (unanimous)
|UFC on ESPN: Brunson vs. Holland
|
|align=center|3
|align=center|5:00
|Las Vegas, Nevada, United States
|
|-
| Win
| align=center| 9–1
|Janaisa Morandin
| Submission (scarf hold keylock)
| Invicta FC 41: Morandin vs. Ruiz
| 
| align=center| 1
| align=center| 3:28
| Kansas City, Kansas, United States
|
|-
| Loss
| align=center|8–1
| Danielle Taylor
|Decision (unanimous)
|Invicta FC 33: Frey vs. Grusander II
|
|align=center|3
|align=center|5:00
|Kansas City, Missouri, United States
|
|-
| Win
| align=center| 8–0
| Sarai Saenz Flores
|Decision (unanimous)
| Xtreme Fighters Latino 36
| 
| align=center| 3
| align=center| 5:00
| Mexico City, Mexico
|
|-
| Win
| align=center| 7–0
| Saray Orozco Rodriguez
| Decision (unanimous)
| The Art of Fighting: In Search of Glory
| 
| align=center| 3
| align=center| 5:00
| Guadalajara, Mexico
| 
|-
| Win
| align=center| 6–0
| Jazmin Gonzalez
| TKO (punches)
| MAX Fights: Battle On The Beach
|
|align=Center|1
|align=center|1:18
|Zihuatanejo Mexico
| 
|-
| Win
| align=center| 5–0
| Pamela Gonzalez
| Submission (armbar)
|MMA Madness 6
|
|align=center|2
|align=center|N/A
|Mexico City, Mexico
|
|-
| Win
| align=center| 4–0
| Diana Reyes
| TKO (punches)
|Urban Fighting League 5
|
|align=center|2
|align=center|3:28
|Cuautitlán Izcalli, Mexico
| 
|-
| Win
| align=center| 3–0
| Paulette Reyes Hernandez
| TKO (punches)
| Maximum Cage Fighting VIP 5
| 
| align=center| 3
| align=center| 3:03
| Mexico City, Mexico
| 
|-
| Win
| align=center| 2–0
| Annely Jimenez Garcia
| Decision (unanimous)
| Xtreme Kombat 25
| 
| align=center| 3
| align=center| 5:00
| Mexico City, Mexico
|
|-
| Win
| align=center| 1–0
| Lucy Moreno Murillo
| Decision (split)
| Gladiators Coliseum 10
| 
| align=center| 3
| align=center| 5:00
| León, Mexico
|

See also 
 List of current UFC fighters
 List of female mixed martial artists

References

External links 
  
  

Living people
1993 births
Mexican female mixed martial artists
Strawweight mixed martial artists
Mixed martial artists utilizing wrestling
Mixed martial artists utilizing Brazilian jiu-jitsu
Sportspeople from León, Guanajuato
Ultimate Fighting Championship female fighters
Mexican practitioners of Brazilian jiu-jitsu
Female Brazilian jiu-jitsu practitioners